The Columbia Water Center (CWC) was established in January 2008 as Columbia University branch Earth institute on researching and addressing global water-related challenges, including water scarcity, access and quality, alongside Climate risks and changes.

Its stated mission is to "creatively tackle water challenges of a rapidly changing environment and Earth’s biodiversity contribution of humanity’s carbon footprint affecting the water including climate change affecting food, energy, ecosystems and urbanization," by combining "the rigor of scientific research with the impact of effective policy."

The Center takes a multidisciplinary approach to their mission, employing hydrologists, climatologists, environmental engineers, and water policy analysts. Its directors are Upmanu Lall and Carol Silberstein, Professor of Earth, Environmental Engineering, Civil Engineering and Engineering Mechanics at Columbia University.

Pierre Gentine, assistant professor in the Department of Earth and Environmental Engineering, also takes a leading role in the Center, with his own PhD and Post-doctoral team focusing on the interactions between soil and atmospheric moisture.

The Center currently divides its projects into five themes: America's Water, The Global Floods Initiative, Data Analytics and Multi-Scale Predictions, Risk and Financial Instruments and the Water, Food, Energy Nexus.



Background
The Earth Institute, under the leadership of Jeff Sachs, is a research institution that supports sustainable development from various angles.

In 2008, the PepsiCo Foundation awarded the Earth Institute $6 million to address these water-related issues. The PepsiCo grant led to the establishment of the Columbia Water Center under the leadership of Columbia University engineering professor Upmanu Lall.  This three-year grant made possible projects in four countries: India, China, Mali, and Brazil.

In Brazil, CWC has partnered with the Federal University of Ceará in the northeast to focus on sophisticated climate-based forecasting systems used for water allocation decisions across diverse use sectors.  In addition, the CWC team recently completed a municipal water plan (PAM) for Milhã, a rural area in central Ceará. The project outlines a plan for the municipality to deliver water to all of its 14,000 residents.

As part of the project, the CWC designed and built water infrastructure demonstration projects for Ingá and Pedra Fina, two communities in Milhã. The project provides water to 500 people in the area.

In India, the project focuses on reducing water consumption in the agricultural sector by encouraging sustainable crop choice patterns, as well as working with corporations to deploy better irrigation technologies (and increase reliability) throughout their supply chains.  A key objective is to reduce the groundwater stress in the region. Primary project locations are in the states of Punjab and Gujarat.

In Punjab, the CWC has partnered with Punjab Agricultural University to come up with innovative solutions to reduce farmer irrigation. Some of the methods developed (including the use of inexpensive tensiometers to measure soil moisture and direct seeding of rice) were field tested in the 2010 planting season with over 500 farmers participating. The Punjab Agricultural University team reports that participating farmers saved 25 to 30 percent of their normal water use by implementing the new approaches. The CWC/PAU team plans to scale up the pilot project in 2011 by recruiting 5,000 rice farmers to use tensiometers.

In Gujarat, the Columbia Water Center is working with the state government to reform electricity subsidies to provide a greater incentive for farmers to conserve water. In conjunction with subsidy reform, the CWC is also piloting water saving technologies among farmers.

The work in Mali coincides with the Millennium Villages Project. CWC is focusing on designing irrigation and cropping systems that can be operated and maintained locally in order to provide farmers with higher-value cash crops. The center has installed large pumps that improved the amount of water available.  Projects emphasize bringing together local partners, market forces and public-private partnerships.

Current Research 

In recent years, the Columbia Water Center has expanded the scope of its initiatives to encompass five broad research themes.

America's Water

The America's Water Initiative is aims to build a network of academic institutions, government agencies, and private industry to inform water infrastructure improvements in the United States and address other water challenges. The initiative focuses on all aspects of water, from policy to drought and flood forecasting and the potential for disruptive water technology to provide distributed water infrastructure that is less expensive than replacing legacy systems.

On March 12, 2015, the initiative held its first annual symposium, which brought together water experts from various groups, representing the industry, utilities, policy and non-profit sectors among others. The meeting was intended to be a first step toward a broader working relationship that can help set a water research agenda and develop solutions for national water challenges.

The Global Floods Initiative

The Global Floods Initiative aims to apply cutting-edge and continually evolving  climate forecasting techniques to help helping policymakers, disaster relief agencies, infrastructure designers, financial institutions and others better prepare for, manage and respond to extreme floods.

The initiative builds on almost two decades of research on how the quasi-periodic climate cycles (such as El-Nino/La-Nina and the Pacific Decadal Oscillation) interact to increase the risk of flooding in particular locations. More recent research into hydrometerology, which looks at the interaction of land, water and atmosphere at a more local scale, adds additional layers to the potential for flood prediction.

Data Analytics and Multi-Scale Predictions

The Columbia Water Center is a leader in predicting seasonal hydroclimate forecasts and associated risk analyses. These forecasts are used for a variety of applications, including integrating climate forecasts into water allocation procedures for urban, industrial and agricultural consumers.

New ways of representing convection and vegetation response to water stress are also major areas of research, the results of which could offer new understandings of the carbon and hydrological cycle.

Risk and Financial Instruments

Climate forecasting can also be used to develop flood and drought risk metrics for companies with global supply chains. These metrics can help companies address challenges through new sourcing strategies, novel regional financial risk management products (e.g., cat bonds, index insurance), pre-emptive maintenance and mitigation, reservoir reallocation agreements and other tools.

Water, Food, Energy Nexus

The Columbia Water Center  studies how the water, food, and energy sectors are interrelated and how climate affects this relationship. Projects include policy research and recommendations to  promote water and energy savings in the agricultural sector in water-stressed farming regions, development of seasonal forecasts to guide decision-making in the water and energy sectors, and testing and implementation of low-cost soil moisture and nitrogen sensors to improve irrigation efficiency, reducing fertilizer use and groundwater pollution and saving energy from groundwater pumping.

References

External links
The Columbia Water Center
Partnership Institutions
The Earth Institute
PepsiCo Foundation
Columbia University

Columbia University
Columbia University research institutes
Sustainability organizations
Environmental research institutes
Water and society
International sustainable development